The  First Decade may refer to:

The First Decade (album), an album by April Wine
The First Decade (poem), a poem by Niccolò Machiavelli
Command & Conquer: The First Decade, a Command & Conquer compilation
The First Decade (1983–1993), an album by Michael W. Smith